The 2015 FIFA Women's World Cup qualification UEFA Group 3 was a UEFA qualifying group for the 2015 FIFA Women's World Cup. The group comprised Denmark, Iceland, Israel, Malta, Serbia and Switzerland.

The group winners qualified directly for the 2015 FIFA Women's World Cup. Among the seven group runners-up, the four best (determined by records against the first-, third-, fourth- and fifth-placed teams only for balance between different groups) advanced to the play-offs.

After winning 9–0 at home against Israel on 14 June 2014, Switzerland qualified for the 2015 Women's World Cup on 15 June after Denmark's match with Iceland ended in a draw, which meant that Switzerland was assured group winners. Switzerland also became the first European nation to qualify for the 2015 Women's World Cup.

Standings

Results
All times are CEST (UTC+02:00) during summer and CET (UTC+01:00) during winter.

Goalscorers
10 goals
 Lara Dickenmann

9 goals
 Ana-Maria Crnogorčević

8 goals
 Ramona Bachmann

7 goals

 Dagný Brynjarsdóttir
 Vanessa Bürki
 Fabienne Humm

5 goals
 Harpa Þorsteinsdóttir

4 goals

 Pernille Harder
 Nadia Nadim
 Johanna Rasmussen
 Martina Moser

3 goals

 Line Røddik Hansen
 Karoline Smidt Nielsen
 Dóra María Lárusdóttir
 Jelena Čubrilo

2 goals

 Mariann Gajhede Knudsen
 Sanne Troelsgaard Nielsen
 Fanndís Friðriksdóttir
 Elín Jensen
 Lee Falkon
 Moran Fridman
 Daniel Sofer
 Jelena Čanković
 Tijana Krstić
 Danka Podovac
 Caroline Abbé
 Rahel Kiwic

1 goal

 Nanna Christiansen
 Sofie Junge Pedersen
 Simone Boye Sørensen
 Arna Ásgrímsdóttir
 Sara Björk Gunnarsdóttir
 Þóra Björg Helgadóttir
 Rakel Hönnudóttir
 Gudmunda Brynja Óladóttir
 Katrín Ómarsdóttir
 Hólmfríður Magnúsdóttir
 Margrét Lára Viðarsdóttir
 Glódís Perla Viggósdóttir
 Rachel Shelina Israel
 Moran Lavi
 Biljana Bradić
 Jovana Damnjanović
 Indira Ilić
 Marija Ilić
 Aleksandra Savanović
 Vesna Smiljković
 Vanessa Bernauer
 Sandra Betschart
 Nicole Remund
 Lia Wälti

Notes

References

External links
Women's World Cup – Qualifying round Group 3, UEFA.com

Group 3
2013–14 in Danish women's football
2014–15 in Danish women's football
2013–14 in Israeli women's football
2014–15 in Israeli women's football
2013 in Icelandic football
2014 in Icelandic football
2013–14 in Serbian football
2014–15 in Serbian football
2013–14 in Maltese football
2014–15 in Maltese football
2013–14 in Swiss football
2014–15 in Swiss football